Michael van der Heijden (born 10 March 1982 in The Hague, Netherlands) is a Dutch footballer.

He had a trial at Swansea City in July 2008. Hereford United in League One attempted to sign him on loan in August, but this fell through.

Notes

1982 births
Living people
Footballers from The Hague
Dutch footballers
Association football midfielders
ADO Den Haag players
RKC Waalwijk players
FC Dordrecht players
HFC Haarlem players
Almere City FC players